Mingo is an unincorporated community in Tishomingo County, Mississippi, in the United States.

History
Mingo was named for the Mingo Branch, upon which it is located.

References

Unincorporated communities in Tishomingo County, Mississippi
Unincorporated communities in Mississippi
Mississippi placenames of Native American origin